Loving-kindness may refer to:

 an English translation of Chesed, a term found in the Hebrew Bible
 an English translation of Mettā or maitrī, a term used in Buddhism